Nicholas John Pringle (born 20 September 1966) is a former English cricketer who played for Somerset County Cricket Club between 1986 and 1991.  A right-handed batsman and right-arm medium-fast bowler, he played 27 first-class matches and 12 List A matches during his career.  He also made appearances in the Second Eleven Championship for Durham, Gloucestershire and Leicestershire.

Cricket career
Pringle made his first-class debut for Somerset late in the 1986 season against Worcestershire, bowling 10 overs in the first-innings without a wicket.  Batting as part of the lower order, he scored 10 and 11 as Somerset lost by an innings after being forced to follow on.  By the time of his next appearance in the County Championship midway through the following season, Pringle was considered more of a batsman, being moved up to number five.  Playing back-to-back matches, Pringle enjoyed his best batting display in the next match, against Warwickshire.  He scored a career-high 79, and shared a fourth-wicket partnership of 193 with Martin Crowe.  His final match for Somerset in August 1991 against the touring Sri Lankans.

References

External links
 
 

1966 births
Living people
Sportspeople from Weymouth
Cricketers from Dorset
English cricketers
Somerset cricketers